Fântâna may refer to several places in Romania:

 Fântâna, a village in Hoghiz Commune, Braşov County
 Fântâna, a village in Lunca Cernii de Jos Commune, Hunedoara County
 Fântâna, a tributary of the Vișeu in Maramureș County
 Fântâna Fătului, a tributary of the Balasan in Dolj County
 Fântâna Tulbure, a tributary of the Muereasca in Vâlcea County
 După Fântână, a tributary of the Pârâul Țigăncilor in Iași County

See also 
 Fântânele (disambiguation)
 Fîntînița, a commune in Drochia district, Moldova